The Pasadena Playhouse is a historic performing arts venue located 39 S. El Molino Avenue in Pasadena, California, United States. The 686-seat auditorium produces a variety of cultural and artistic events, professional shows, and community engagements each year.

History

Beginning around 1912, the period known as the Little Theatre Movement developed in cities and towns across the United States. The artistic community that founded the Pasadena Playhouse was started in 1916 when actor-director Gilmor Brown began producing a series of plays at a renovated burlesque theatre with his troupe "The Gilmor Brown Players". Brown established the Community Playhouse Association of Pasadena in 1917 that would later become the Pasadena Playhouse Association, which necessitated a new venue for productions.

The community theatre organization quickly grew and in May 1924, the citizens of Pasadena raised funds to build a new theatre in the city center at 39 South El Molino Avenue. Completed in 1925, the theatre was designed in a Spanish Colonial Revival style by Pasadena artist and architect Elmer Grey, with a fire curtain painted by Pasadena artist Alson S. Clark.

Its non-professional, community beginnings and the tremendous amount of local support for the project led George Bernard Shaw to dub Pasadena "the Athens of the West", likening the enterprise to the ancient Festival Dionysia.

The building that was designed by Grey and built by the Winter Construction Co. drew the attention of the nation, bringing Southern California world premieres by authors such as Eugene O'Neill, William Saroyan, Noël Coward, F. Scott Fitzgerald and Tennessee Williams, as well as many English language premieres of significant Continental dramas. The Playhouse was recognized by the Legislature as the State Theatre of California in 1937.

A school of theatre arts was established in the late 1920s that became an accredited college by 1937, eventually training such notable talents as Raymond Burr, Victor Mature, Ernest Borgnine, Eleanor Parker, Charles Bronson, Ray Vasquez, Gene Hackman, Dustin Hoffman, Sally Struthers, Jamie Farr, Mako and others. During the school years, the Playhouse was very active, having as many as five independent stages in operation at any given time, giving 306–322 performances annually on the main stage alone. In order to provide housing for the many students, older homes along El Molino Avenue were modified to become dormitories.

The varied staging capabilities offered by its five venues led the Playhouse to become one of the first companies in California to experiment with new theatrical forms such as theatre-in-the-round. The Playhouse also built and operated one of the first television stations in Southern California. In addition to training the Air Force to use television and radio equipment, the Pasadena Playhouse supplied the majority of Southern California's early TV stations with the first trained technicians in the business.

Due to changes in Actors' Equity Association laws, and the opening of drama departments in many schools and universities across the country, the School of Theatre Arts shut down in 1969. Later that year, after the death of founding director Gilmor Brown, the theatre itself went bankrupt. After six years, the city bought the building in 1975 and later transferred it to real estate developer David Houk. After it lay dormant for 17 years, he relaunched the theatre in 1986 as a place to develop shows that would tour other California venues. While the Pasadena Playhouse reopened for use as a community theatre, the acting school remained closed. Over the next twenty years, the theatre staged classic drama, new musicals and plays, and integrated itself as an educational facility, slowly regaining a prominent place in the national theatre scene to become a major operation of over eight million dollars a year by 2008.

2010-2011 financial situation

Regardless of continued recent critical acclaim of the Playhouse, and despite its steadily popular and ambitious season schedules, the theatre had a history of financial difficulties since its reopening in the 1980s. Saddled with millions of dollars' worth of debt from earlier unforeseen expenditures during the theatre's restoration, the Playhouse's operators struggled with balancing interest and loan repayments with increasing running costs.

On January 29, 2010, the Los Angeles Times announced that, due to financial difficulties, the theatre would close on February 7 after its run of the musical Camelot and cancel the remaining 2010 season. On May 11, 2010, the Pasadena Playhouse filed for Chapter 11 bankruptcy protection and announced an intention to restructure its operations to reduce its debt burden.

After less than four months, on July 7, 2010, it emerged from bankruptcy after a multimillion-dollar anonymous matching fund contribution toward operating costs and judicially approved debt cancellation. The Pasadena Playhouse also reduced paid staff to essential upper level administration, keeping the Artistic Director Sheldon Epps as coordinator for the rest of the planned consolidation. Director Epps announced through an interview with the LA Times that the shake-up was intended to put the theatre back on solid financial footing and ensure the Playhouse's survival into the future. The Playhouse released a tentative Fall/Winter season schedule including one new production of Dangerous Beauty slated for January 2011. Plans for a new extension and 400 seat venue designed pro bono by Frank Gehry that was announced in 2007 but was never built.

A majority of the subscribers donated the rest of their season back to the theatre rather than requesting refunds, recusing the theatre of over a million dollars in possible financial liability. Epps has said that as the debt burden is lifted these steps will allow the theatre to carefully and responsibly rebuild the company.

On April 1, 2011 the Playhouse held a "Premiere Gala: Opening Night" to celebrate its newfound financial solvency and announce next year's productions.

The Next Century 
In 2017, after 20 years as artistic director, Sheldon Epps announced his departure from the theater. Epps produced over 100 plays during his tenure and personally directed 13 of them. Danny Feldman, the executive director at Labyrinth Theater Company in New York was chosen as his replacement.

Awards and nominations

Notable alumni and players

Ariana Grande
Martha Allan
Louise Allbritton
John Alvin
Dana Andrews
Morris Ankrum
Eve Arden
Jean Arthur
Ed Asner
Gordon Atkinson
Claudia Barrett
Angela Bassett
Florence Bates
Ernest Borgnine
Wayne Brady
Henry Brandon
Charles Bronson
Joshua Bryant
Edgar Buchanan
Raymond Burr
Ruth Buzzi
Richard Carlson
Youssef Chahine
Jack T. Chick
Lee J. Cobb
Maxine Cooper Gomberg
John Conte
Laird Cregar
Donald Curtis
Helmut Dantine
Henry Darrow
Herschel Daugherty
Frances Dee
Don DeFore
Agnes De Mille
Bill Erwin
Gene Evans
Jamie Farr
Yvonne Lime Fedderson (as Yvonne Lime)
Frank Ferguson
Horton Foote
Martha Graham
Dabbs Greer
Gene Hackman
William Henry
 Peter Hansen
Neil Patrick Harris
Samuel S. Hinds
Max Hodge
Dustin Hoffman
William Holden
Earl Holliman
Kim Hunter
Martha Hyer
Carolyn Jones
Victor Jory
Werner Klemperer
John Meredyth Lucas
Helen Mack
Mako
John Mantley
Hugh Marlowe
Kerwin Mathews
Victor Mature
Marilyn Maxwell
Rue McClanahan
Joel McCrea
Eve McVeagh
Ruth Mix
Douglass Montgomery
Mickey Moore
Wayne Morris
Ben Murphy
George Nader
John M. Nickolaus, Jr.
Leonard Nimoy
David Niven
Lloyd Nolan
Nick Nolte
Moroni Olsen
Al Pacino (2017)
Eleanor Parker
Tyrone Power
Robert Preston
George Reeves (as George Bessolo)
Robert Ridgely
John Ritter
Robert Rockwell
Barbara Rush
Ben Savage
Joe Sawyer (as Joseph Sauers)
Randolph Scott
Ralph Senensky
Maria Solveg
Paul Sorensen
Harry Dean Stanton
Edward Stephenson
Julie Stevens
Onslow Stevens
Sally Struthers
Gloria Stuart
Robert Taylor
Toni Trucks
Daniel Truhitte
Catherine Turney
Joan Valerie
Ray Vasquez
James Westerfield
Joan Wheeler
Frank Wilcox 
Jo Anne Worley
Maris Wrixon
Meg Wyllie
Gig Young (as Byron Barr)
Robert Young
Paul Zastupnevich

References

External links

 Pasadena Playhouse website
 Pasadena Playhouse blog
 Pasadena Playhouse MySpace page

Buildings and structures in Pasadena, California
Theatres in Los Angeles County, California
Culture of Pasadena, California
California Historical Landmarks
Buildings and structures on the National Register of Historic Places in Pasadena, California
Theatres on the National Register of Historic Places in California
Theatres completed in 1925
Event venues established in 1925
2010 disestablishments in California
Tourist attractions in Pasadena, California
Elmer Grey buildings
Spanish Colonial Revival architecture in California
Symbols of California